Blastobasis aynekiella is a moth in the  family Blastobasidae. It is found in Kenya. The habitat consists of the western highlands of the Kakamega Forest.

The length of the forewings is 6.9–8.3 mm. The forewings are yellowish brown intermixed with similarly colored scales. The hindwings are grey.

The larvae feed on Chrysophyllum albidum, Mimusops bagshawei, Olea welwitschii, Prunus africana and Tiliacora funifera.

Etymology
The species epithet, aynekiella, refers to the name of the country in which this species is known to occur, but spelled backward, with the Latin suffix -iella (meaning small) added.

References

Endemic moths of Kenya
Moths described in 2010
Blastobasis
Moths of Africa